Amphion Loudspeakers Ltd. is a Finnish company, producing home loudspeakers and professional studio monitors. The company was founded in 1998, and in 2017 it had ten full-time employees. Amphion's turnover in 2017 was 2,2 million euros. Amphion's model series, from the smallest to the biggest, are called Ion, Helium, Argon, and Krypton. The studio line-up includes five monitors and three bass extension/subwoofer systems.

Design approach
In their designs, they emphasize controlled directivity to minimize the effect of room reflections on sound quality. They call this principle uniformly directive diffusion. The company's signature design approach is the use of specific waveguide and very low crossover point (audio crossover). The low crossover point (at 1600 Hz) puts it outside the human's most critical hearing range (between 2000 and 5000 Hz) which makes the crossover between the tweeter and woofer undistinguishable. Waveguide is also used to align the drivers timewise and unify their dispersion throughout a wide frequency band. Amphion's home loudspeakers and studio monitors work as point sources and in phase coherent manner.

Notable users
According to the Managing Director and founder Anssi Hyvönen, Amphion speakers have been used by a number of notable sound engineers around the world, such as Dave Pensado (1 Grammy, 4 nominations), Jacquire King (2 wins, 1 nomination – Norah Jones, Kings of Leon, Tom Waits), Jack Joseph Puig (2 Grammys, 4 nominations – U2, Sheryl Crow, John Mayer), Robert Carranza (4-time Grammy winner – Jack Johnson, Los Lobos, Marilyn Manson), Fabian Marasciullo (Grammy Award Winning mixing engineer – Lil Wayne, Rick Ross, T-Pain, Sean Paul, DJ Khaled), Luis Diaz (a multi-platinum, Grammy award-winning music producer, executive producer and mix engineer – The Baha-Men, P Diddy, 50 Cent, Juvenile, Beenie Man, Trick Daddy, Lil Jon, Beyoncé, Toni Braxton, Mary J Blige, Lauryn Hill, Pitbull).

See also 
 List of studio monitor manufacturers

References

External links
 
 
 Anssi Hyvönen Interview NAMM Oral History Library (2019)

Loudspeaker manufacturers
Audio equipment manufacturers of Finland
Finnish brands
Companies established in 1998